Stanovishchi is a rural locality (a village) in Krasnoplamenskoye Rural Settlement, Alexandrovsky District, Vladimir Oblast, Russia. The population was 1 as of 2010. There is 1 street.

Geography 
Stanovishchi is located on the Dubna River, 36 km northwest of Alexandrov (the district's administrative centre) by road. Vaulino is the nearest rural locality.

References 

Rural localities in Alexandrovsky District, Vladimir Oblast